Ava Ohlgren (born January 31, 1988) is an American competition swimmer who has represented the United States in international events.

Career
Ohlgren is a former NCAA champion in the 400 y IM (2007) and 200 y IM (2008). At the 2007 Pan American Games, Ohlgren won the 200 m freestyle and swam the third leg of the 4x20 0m freestyle relay, which also won gold.  Ohlgren competed at the 2009 World University Games and won five gold medals, the most for any athlete from Auburn.

References

External links
 

1988 births
Living people
American female freestyle swimmers
American female medley swimmers
Auburn Tigers women's swimmers
People from Morganton, North Carolina
Swimmers at the 2007 Pan American Games
Pan American Games gold medalists for the United States
Pan American Games medalists in swimming
Universiade medalists in swimming
Universiade gold medalists for the United States
Medalists at the 2009 Summer Universiade
Medalists at the 2007 Pan American Games
21st-century American women